Road 99 is the most eastern road in Iran. It is a road connecting Iranian border forts to each other used to move supplies to this fort to fight drug trafficking. The only important part is the southern part connecting Zabol to Zahedan and Birjand road. It was built by emperor Mozaffar ad-Din Shah Qajar in the 1890s to act as a military supply route for the Eastern border.

References

External links 

 Iran road map on Young Journalists Club

Roads in Iran
Transportation in Razavi Khorasan Province
Transportation in Sistan and Baluchestan Province